Kolešov is a municipality and village in Rakovník District in the Central Bohemian Region of the Czech Republic. It has about 100 inhabitants.

Geography
It lies in an agricultural landscape in the Rakovník Uplands.

History
The first written mention of Kolešov is from 1319.

Transport
There is an intersection of two important roads: the I/6 road, part of the European route E48, which replaces the unfinished section of the D6 motorway from Prague to Karlovy Vary, and the I/27 road, leading from Plzeň to Most.

Sights
There are no sights protected as cultural monuments. In the centre of Kolešov is a small chapel.

References

External links

Villages in Rakovník District